GHQ may refer to:
 Garhwa railway station, in Jharkhand, India
 General Health Questionnaire
 General headquarters, or, specifically:
 General Headquarters (Pakistan Army)
 Supreme Commander for the Allied Powers (General Headquarters in occupied Japan)
 India Command, in British India
 United States Army Air Corps (previously known as General Headquarters Air Force)
 FM HD3 channels of WUFT-FM
 GHQ (company), which produces 1:285 scale micro armor for miniature wargaming